The Maritime Safety Administration of the People's Republic of China (CMSA) is a government agency which administers all matters related to maritime and shipping safety, including the supervision of maritime traffic safety and security, prevention of pollution from ships, inspection of ships and offshore facilities, navigational safety measures (including Search and Rescue, Aids to Navigation and the GMDSS), administrative management of port operations, and law enforcement on matters of maritime safety law. It was also responsible for marine accident investigation. It is headquartered in Dongcheng District, Beijing.

In October 1998, it was formed by the merger of the China Ship Inspection Bureau and the China Port Supervision Bureau into a comprehensive agency of maritime affairs, subordinate to the Ministry of Transport of the People's Republic of China.
The China MSA was the only maritime administrative agency that was not merged into the new China Coast Guard[4] in June 2013. The CMSA retains its safety and control ("traffic police") remit, while the new CCG concentrates all other law enforcement and policing duties.

Administrative Structure
The agency is organized into the following structure:

 Major Functions
 Safety Management of Shipping Company
 Survey of Ships
 Flag State Control
 Port State Control
 Prevention of Pollution from Ships
 Safe Carriage of Dangerous Goods
 Training, Examination and Certification of Seafarers
 Seafarers' Passports
 Aids to Navigation
 Hydrographic Survey
 Marine Traffic Control
 China Ship Reporting System (CHISREP)
 Navigational Warnings and Notices
 Vessel Traffic Service
 Maritime Search and Rescue
 Marine Accident Investigation
 Education and Training
 International Cooperation
 Law enforcement

Operational organization
The MSA operates primarily along the PRC coastline and Yangtze River, Pearl River and Heilongjiang Rivers. The MSA maintains 20 Regional MSAs, one per coastal province, under which 97 local branches have been established.

Regional MSAs

Changjiang MSA
Fujian MSA
Guangdong MSA
Guangxi MSA
Hainan MSA
Hebei MSA
Heilongjiang MSA
Jiangsu MSA
Liaoning MSA
Shandong MSA
Shanghai MSA
Shenzhen MSA
Tianjin MSA
Zhejiang MSA

Strength
The MSA's 25,000 officials, other working staff, operate a patrol force of 1,300 vessels and watercraft of various types. These include 207 patrol vessels of 20 meters and greater length, 2 are 100 meters and above, 2 are 60 meters and above, 18 are 40 meters and above, 59 are 30 meters and above and 126 are 20 meters and above.

Fleet

 Haixun 01 Patrol Ship
 Haixun 03 Patrol Ship
 Haixun 06 Patrol Ship
 Haixun 09 Patrol Ship
 Haixun 31 Patrol Ship
 Haixun 21 Patrol Ship
 Haijing 31025 Patrol ship
 RHIB
 Harbin Z-9 helicopter - contracted out to CITIC Offshore Helicopter
 Eurocopter EC 135
 Changhe Aircraft Industries Corporation CA109

See also

China Coast Guard
China Marine Surveillance
International Convention for the Safety of Life at Sea
International Regulations for Preventing Collisions at Sea

References

External links
 China Maritime Safety Administration official website 
 China Maritime Safety Administration official website 
State Oceanic Administration (Zhong ghuo hai jian) 
 Aid to navigation  
 China Hydrography 

 
Sea rescue organizations
Maritime Safety Administration
Maritime Safety Administration
1998 establishments in China
Maritime safety organizations
Dongcheng District, Beijing
Government agencies established in 1998
Organizations based in Beijing
Ministry of Transport of the People's Republic of China
1949 establishments in China
Government agencies established in 1949